Afton is a town in Lincoln County, Wyoming, United States. The population was 1,911 at the 2010 census.

Afton is home to the world's largest arch made of elk antlers.

History
The first settlement at Afton was made in 1885. The community takes its name from the River Afton, in Ayrshire, Scotland.

Geography
Afton is the largest city in Star Valley, a grassland valley in forested mountains.

A periodic spring is Afton's main water supply, which cycles on and off during the summer, fall, and winter at 12 to 18 minute intervals. During the spring the flow never stops due to increased water supply from the melting snowpack. At full flow the Intermittent Spring discharges up to 285 gallons per second. It is located five miles east of Afton, a short hike from the end of Swift Creek Road.

Climate

According to the Köppen Climate Classification system, Afton has a warm-summer humid continental, abbreviated "Dfb" on climate maps.

Demographics

2010 census
At the 2010 census there were 1,911 people, 703 households, and 496 families living in the town. The racial makeup of the town was 94.1% White, 0.2% African American, 0.7% Native American, 0.2% Asian, 2.6% from other races, and 2.2% from two or more races. Hispanic or Latino of any race were 4.2%.

Of the 703 households 38.5% had children under the age of 18 living with them, 59.2% were married couples living together, 8.0% had a female householder with no husband present, 3.4% had a male householder with no wife present, and 29.4% were non-families. 26.2% of households were one person and 10.6% were one person aged 65 or older. The average household size was 2.68 and the average family size was 3.26.

The median age in the town was 33 years. 32% of residents were under the age of 18; 7.6% were between the ages of 18 and 24; 23.2% were from 25 to 44; 23% were from 45 to 64; and 14.3% were 65 or older. The gender makeup of the town was 49.7% male and 50.3% female.

2000 census
At the 2000 census there were 1,818 people, 651 households, and 475 families living in the town. The population density was 530.8 people per square mile (204.6/km). There were 769 housing units at an average density of 224.5 per square mile (86.6/km).  The racial makeup of the town was 97.19% White, 0.06% African American, 0.39% Native American, 0.06% Asian, 0.94% from other races, and 1.38% from two or more races. Hispanic or Latino of any race were 2.81%.

Of the 651 households 38.2% had children under the age of 18 living with them, 62.5% were married couples living together, 7.7% had a female householder with no husband present, and 26.9% were non-families. 24.1% of households were one person and 9.2% were one person aged 65 or older. The average household size was 2.76 and the average family size was 3.32.

The age distribution was 32.3% under the age of 18, 9.7% from 18 to 24, 23.6% from 25 to 44, 20.5% from 45 to 64, and 13.9% 65 or older. The median age was 33 years. For every 100 females, there were 90.4 males. For every 100 females age 18 and over, there were 88.7 males.

The median household income was $37,292 and the median family income was $43,400. Males had a median income of $33,472 versus $20,893 for females. The per capita income for the town was $16,177. About 5.5% of families and 7.6% of the population were below the poverty line, including 9.8% of those under age 18 and 5.2% of those age 65 or over.

Education
Public education in the town of Afton is provided by Lincoln County School District #2. Zoned campuses include Afton Elementary School (grades K-3), Osmond Elementary School (grades 4–6), Thayne Elementary School (grades K-3), Etna Elementary School (grades 4–6), Star Valley Middle School (grades 7–8), and Star Valley High School (grades 9–12).

Afton has a public library, a branch of the Lincoln County Public Library System.

Notable people
 Rulon Gardner (born 1971)  Olympic Greco-Roman wrestler, gold medalist at 2000 Summer Olympics and bronze medalist at 2004 Summer Olympics
 Velma Linford (1907–2002)  educator, politician

See also
List of municipalities in Wyoming

References

External links
 Town of Afton, Wyoming
 Afton Civic Center
 Star Valley Branch Library Homepage

Towns in Lincoln County, Wyoming
Towns in Wyoming